Lizzie Zipmouth (2000) is a children's novel by author Jacqueline Wilson. It follows a young girl named Lizzie who copes with moving into a new home. It is aimed for 7- to 10-year-old readers, and is written in a fun and believable way to connect with the audience.

Plot 

Lizzie Zipmouth is about a young girl named  Lizzie who moves into a new home with her mother after her once-single mother finds a new boyfriend, Sam. Disgruntled and unhappy about the way these proceedings are going, she doesn't try to make friends with Sam's two sons, Rory and Jake, and keeps to herself by not saying a word. Soon, Jake nicknames her 'Lizzie Zipmouth' because of her obvious silence to everyone. It is only when she meets her scary step-great-grandmother that she begins to find a connection with her new family, bonding with Great-Gran over their love of dolls. However, Great-Gran has a bad stroke, and the family is unsure of the outcome. Lizzie, using Great-Gran's phrases and back-chats, manages to snap Great-Gran out of her ill trance. Soon, Great-Gran is making a full recovery and Lizzie is not so zipmouthed anymore.

References 

2000 British novels
British children's novels
Novels by Jacqueline Wilson
2000 children's books
Corgi books